Musicians experience a number of health problems related to the practice and performance of music.

Health conditions
The most common injury type suffered by musicians is repetitive strain injury (RSIs). A survey of orchestral performers found that 64–76% had significant RSIs. Other types of musculoskeletal disorders, such as carpal tunnel syndrome and focal dystonia, are also common.

Non-musculoskeletal problems include contact dermatitis, hearing problems such as tinnitus, hearing loss, hyperacusis and diplacusis   respiratory disorders or pneumothorax, increased intraocular pressure, gastroesophageal reflux disease, and psychological issues such as performance anxiety. Musicians may suffer tinnitus and hearing disorders due to exposure to loud music, such as hyperacusis or diplacusis. They also are at an increased risk of having problems with the stomatognathic system, in particular mouth and teeth, which may in some cases lead to permanent injuries that prevent the musicians from playing. There is little consistency across the hearing healthcare sector with respect to care of musicians' hearing and provision of hearing protection. However, the American Academy of Audiology has published a consensus document regarding best practices for hearing loss prevention with musicians.

Playing a brass or woodwind instrument puts the musician at greater risk of inguinal hernia. Woodwind instrumentalists, in rare cases, suffer a condition known as hypersensitivity pneumonitis, also referred to as saxophone lung, can be caused by Exophiala infection. It is held that this can occur if instruments are not cleaned properly.

The risk of DJ's working in nightclubs with loud music includes noise-induced hearing loss and tinnitus. Nightclubs constantly exceed safe levels of noise exposure with average sound levels ranging from 93.2 to 109.7 dB. Constant music exposure creates temporary and permanent auditory dysfunction for professional DJ's with average levels at 96dB being above the recommended level, at which ear protection is mandatory for industry. Three quarters of DJs have tinnitus and are at risk of tenosynovitis in the wrists and other limbs. Tenosynovitis results from staying in the same position over multiple gigs for scratching motion and cueing, this would be related to a repetitive strain injury. Gigs can last 4-5 hours in nightlife and the hospitality industry, as a result there are potential complications of prolonged standing which include slouching, varicose veins, cardiovascular disorders, joint compression, and muscle fatigue. This is common for other staff to experience as well including bartenders and security staff for example. The World Health Organization launched the Make Listening Safe initiative as part of the celebration of World Hearing Day on 3 March 2015. WHO reviewed existing noise regulations for various entertainment sites – including clubs, bars, concert venues, and sporting arenas and released a global Standard for Safe Listening Venues and Events as part of World Hearing Day 2022, along with:

 an mSafeListening handbook, on how to create an mHealth safe listening program.
 a media toolkit for journalists containing key information and how to talk about safe listening.

See also
 Performing Arts Medicine
 Safe-In-Sound award
 Safe listening
 Hyperacusis
 Diplacusis

References

External links
 
 National Association of Schools of Music (NASM) and the Performing Arts Medicine Association (PAMA) Advisories on Hearing Health. 

Injuries
Occupational safety and health
Audiology
Hearing loss
Music-related lists